The 2004 Bangkok International Film Festival started on January 22 and ran until February 2. The Golden Kinnaree Awards were announced on January 31.

Awards

Golden Kinnaree International Competition
 Best Film: The Barbarian Invasions (Canada)
 Best Director: Jim Sheridan (In America, Ireland)
 Best Actor: Li Yixiang, Wang Shungbao and Wang Baoqiang (Blind Shaft, China)
 Best Actress: Giovanna Mezzogiorno (Facing Windows, Italy)
 Best ASEAN film: Last Life in the Universe (Thailand)

Asian Shorts and Documentary
 Best Short Documentary: Broken Blossom (Japan)
 Best Live Action: The Anniversary (Vietnam)
 Best Animation: 3 Feet Apart (Singapore)
 Jameson Short Film Award: Mekong Interior (France)

Special awards
Lifetime Achievement Award: Rattana Pestonji
Career Achievement Award: Oliver Stone
Crystal Lens Award: Christopher Doyle

References

External links 
 

2004
2004 in Thailand
2004 film festivals
2004 festivals in Asia
2004 in Bangkok